Moores Airport  is a privately owned, public use airport in St. Lawrence County, New York, United States. It is located three nautical miles (6 km) north of Degrasse, a hamlet in the Town of Russell.

Facilities and aircraft 
Moores Airport covers an area of 64 acres (26 ha) at an elevation of 815 feet (248 m) above mean sea level. It has one runway designated 2/20 with a turf surface measuring 2,200 by 55 feet (671 × 17 m).

For the 12-month period ending September 15, 2011, the airport had 3,500 general aviation aircraft operations, an average of 291 per month. At that time there were nine aircraft based at this airport: 78% single-engine and 22% ultralight.

References

External links 
 Aerial image as of May 1995 from USGS The National Map

Airports in New York (state)
Transportation buildings and structures in St. Lawrence County, New York